The Goldendale Free Public Library in Goldendale, Washington is a historic Carnegie library which is listed on the U.S. National Register of Historic Places.

The library was a project of the Women's Association, a Federated Women's Clubs chapter.

The gables of its roof have circular openings for attic ventilation and parapets above.

It is one of many Carnegie libraries that are listed on the National Register.

References

Libraries in Washington (state)
Libraries on the National Register of Historic Places in Washington (state)
Library buildings completed in 1914
Klickitat County, Washington